Anju Aravind is an Indian actress who has acted in Malayalam, Tamil and Kannada films. In early 2000's she shifted her focus to Malayalam TV serials and shows.

Filmography

TV serials

Partial Tv Serials

Malayalam

 Malarvadi
 Kasthooriman as Sulochana
Kayamkulam Kochunniyude Makan
 Pakida 12
 Jagrutha
 Jagritha
 Oridathoridathu as Charulatha teacher 
 Sandhyaragam
 Omanathingalppakshi as Mercy
 Kadamattathu Kathanar as Bhanumathi
 Pookkalam
  Jalam
 Sree Maha Bhagavatham
 Aaro Oral 
 Murapennu
 Abhayam
 Chandrodheyam
 Niramala
 M T Kadhakal
 Innale
 Kudumbavilakku
 Swararagam
 Surya Puthri
 Swarnamayooram
 Megham
 Aneshi
 Kaliyalla Kalliyanam
 Sasneham
 Sindoorarekha
 Nandini Oppol
 Ahalya
 Amma
 Edavazhiyilepoocha Mindapoocha
 Sthreetham
 Parasparam
 Snehadooram
 Bhariyamare Sookshikuka
 Sarvam Premamayam
 Holidays

Tamil
 Azhagiya Tamil Magal as Saroja
 Aathira as Mangalam
 Kanavugal as Kavitha
 Micro Thodar Macro Sinthanaigal - Ayirathil Oruvanum Nooril Oruthiyum as Vidya 
Micro Thodar Macro Sinthanaigal - Mazhalai Yudham as Narmadha

TV shows

 Thararaja Thararani
 Onnum Onnum Monnnu
 Annie's Kitchen
 Badayi Bunglavu
 Cinema Company
 I Personally
 Taste Time
 Celebrity Kitchen Magic - Finalist
 Ivide Inganannu Bhai
 Rhythm
 Comedy Sthreekal
 X' mas Taste
 B Positive
 Gulumal
 Smart Show
 Manimuzhakkam
 Easy Meals
 Day with a Star
 Valkkanadi
 Nrithalokam
 Star Chat
 Parayam Nedam
 Panam Tharum Padam
 Kalakalaaravam

Youtube channel hosting
 Foodie Buddy Anju Aravind

References

External links

Indian film actresses
Actresses from Kerala
Living people
Actresses in Tamil cinema
Actresses in Malayalam cinema
20th-century Indian actresses
21st-century Indian actresses
Year of birth missing (living people)
Actresses in Kannada cinema
Indian television actresses
Actresses in Malayalam television
Actresses in Tamil television